Herbert Clarence Richards (30 January 1876 – 11 April 1949) was an Australian politician who represented the South Australian House of Assembly multi-member seat of Sturt from 1921 to 1930 for the Liberal Union and Liberal Federation.

References

 

1876 births
1949 deaths
Members of the South Australian House of Assembly